Hydrozagadka is a Polish superhero comedy film. During a summer heat wave, all the water in Warsaw is puzzlingly disappearing. Scientists secretly call upon As (Ace), a superhero who passes his days living as a mild-mannered engineer, to try to solve the mystery. It turns out that a mysterious Maharaja is in league with Doctor Spot to steal Poland's water and take it to the Maharaja's country.

The movie was ostensibly created as a Communist parody of the American ideals glorified in Superman and other superhero films, however Polish audiences instead felt that the film humorously parodied aspects of Polish life under Communist rule, such as the many slogans for a "better life."

Hydrozagadka premiered on 30 April 1971 on Polish television.

Cast 
 Roman Kłosowski - Prince of Kabur
 Zdzisław Maklakiewicz - Dr. Spot
 Wiesław Michnikowski - Professor Milczarek
 Józef Nowak - Jan Walczak / Ace
 Iga Cembrzyńska - Woman in Bar
 Wiesława Mazurkiewicz - Florist
  - Jola
  - Translator
 Jerzy Duszyński - Docent Frątczak
 Wiesław Gołas - Taxi Driver
  - The Little
  - Walczak's Friend
 Franciszek Pieczka - Sailor
  - Walczak's friend
 Jerzy Turek - crossing keeper
 Witold Skaruch - Walczak's friend
 Andrzej Kondratiuk - waggoner

Crew 
 Director - Andrzej Kondratiuk
 Writing credits - Andrzej Kondratiuk, Andrzej Bonarski
 Cinematography - Zygmunt Samosiuk
 Music - Waldemar Kazanecki
 Scenography - Jarosław Świtoniak
 Filmsetting - Jadwiga Zajicek
 Costumes - Joanna Radzka, Alicja Ptaszyńska
 Executive producer - Jerzy Rutowicz

References

External links 
 
 Hydrozagadka  at Superheroes Lives
 "Hydrozagadka" at the filmweb.pl
 Hydrozagadka on Polish Internet Movie Database
 archive version of the site (probably unfinished) about the movie Hydrozagatka created by a fan

1971 films
Polish science fiction comedy films
Superhero comedy films
1970s superhero films

1970s science fiction comedy films
Water scarcity in fiction
1971 comedy films
1970s Polish-language films